Johnston High School is a public secondary school located in Johnston, Iowa. It is part of the Johnston Community School District. The school serves approximately 1,600 students in grades 10 through 12. Freshman students attend Johnston Middle School.

Athletics
Johnston High School's Iowa High School Athletic Association sanctioned teams include baseball, men's and women's basketball, bowling, men's and women's cross country, football, men's and women's golf, men's and women's soccer, women's softball, men's and women's swimming, dance team, cheer, men's and women's tennis, men's and women's track and field, women's volleyball and wrestling.

Notable Alumni
Reid Sinnett professional football player
Quinn Sypniewski professional football player
Elvir Ibisevic professional soccer player
Sammy Smith professional stock car driver

Finances
The Johnston School Board set a date of September 11, 2012 for a special election on a $51 million bond referendum to build a new high school on property already owned by the district. Public meetings were held in the six weeks prior to the special election. However, the measure was voted down by the community, which needed 60 percent approval to pass. On June 25, 2013, a reduced bond referendum of $41 million passed with 66% support.

District renovations 
The aforementioned bond referendum involved the construction of a new high school; modifications were to be made to the then current Johnston High School, Johnston Middle School, and Wallace Elementary School to make them the new middle school, Wallace Elementary, and district administration/programming center, respectively. Renovations were completed prior to the 2017–2018 academic year, and Johnston High School was moved to its current address.

Performing arts 
JHS has an award winning drama program. It also has three competitive show choirs. The show choir program hosts an annual competition.

See also
List of high schools in Iowa

References

External links
 Johnston High School
 Johnston High School "Innovation" varsity show choir and Johnston High School vocal music

Public high schools in Iowa
Schools in Polk County, Iowa
Iowa High School Athletic Association